Koble is a small village north of Loče in the Municipality of Slovenske Konjice in eastern Slovenia. The area is part of the traditional region of Styria and is now included in the Savinja Statistical Region of Slovenia.

References

External links
Koble at Geopedia

Populated places in the Municipality of Slovenske Konjice